Kolsko  is a village in Nowa Sól County, Lubusz Voivodeship, in western Poland. It is the seat of the gmina (administrative district) called Gmina Kolsko.

The village has an approximate population of 1,000.

References

Villages in Nowa Sól County